Susana Echeverría is a paralympic athlete from Spain competing mainly in category F20 throwing events.

Susanna competed in the intellectually disabled class at the 2000 Summer Paralympics in Sydney, Australia.  There she competed in the shot put and the javelin, winning a bronze in the javelin.

References

External links
 

Year of birth missing (living people)
Living people
Paralympic athletes of Spain
Paralympic bronze medalists for Spain
Paralympic medalists in athletics (track and field)
Athletes (track and field) at the 2000 Summer Paralympics
Medalists at the 2000 Summer Paralympics
Spanish female javelin throwers